Ridgewood Station may refer to:

Railway stations
 Ridgewood station, a major New Jersey Transit rail station hub in Ridgewood, Bergen County
 Ridgewood station (Delaware, Lackawanna and Western Railroad), a platform on the Newark and Bloomfield Railroad in Glen Ridge
 Ridgewood station (LIRR Babylon Branch), renamed Wantagh, a station on the Long Island Rail Road
 Ridgewood station (LIRR Evergreen Branch), a station on the Long Island Rail Road
 Ridgewood station (LIRR Lower Montauk), a station on the Long Island Rail Road